Long Lake is a freshwater lake located in Thurston County, Washington, United States. It consists of two basins connected by a narrow neck. It is two miles (3.2 km) long and has two islands, Holmes Island (13 acres / 5.3 ha) and Kirby Island (2.4 acres / 1 ha). Long Lake is fed by Pattison Lake and drains via Himes/Woodland Creek and Lois Lake to Henderson Inlet. Long Lake was given its descriptive name in 1853.

Public access

Boat launch
The lake can be accessed via a Washington State Department of Fish and Wildlife (WDFW) boat launch. The launch is open during fishing season and requires a WDFW vehicle use permit.

Long Lake Park
Long Lake Park is a 10-acre (4 ha) park operated by the City of Lacey which features a swimming beach, sand-volleyball courts, and barbecue facilities. The park has  of beach frontage as well as picnic facilities and pedestrian trails through the woods.  
The city calls the swimming beach one of the finest in Thurston County. The park is open from 7 am to dusk.

Fishing
The following species of fish can be found in Long Lake:
 Largemouth bass
 Rock bass
 Bluegill
 Brown bullhead
 Eurasian carp
 Yellow perch
 Pumpkinseed
 Suckerfish
 Coastal cutthroat trout
 Rainbow trout
 Warmouth

Lake Management District
Since 1987, Long Lake property owners have authorized Lake Management District No. 19 to oversee the management of the lake. The District was authorized for January 1, 2011 to December 31, 2015.

Goals
 Monitor and manage any recurrence of milfoil or emergence of other aquatic plants to meet recreational and aesthetic needs, fishery and wildlife habitat requirements, and watershed concerns.
 Conduct water quality monitoring
 Investigate and promote best management practices and shoreline enhancement to decrease phosphorus loading.
 Implement the Long Lake Management Plan.
 Investigate, advise, and report upon impacts caused by the increased population and popular use of Long Lake, while maintaining quality of life on and around the lake.
 Maintain a steering committee responsible for directing LMD activities, overseeing finances and communicating with property owners.

Boating safety rules
Thurston County establishes regulations regarding boating operations and water safety on Long Lake.
 In 2014, Long Lake was added to the WDFW list of lakes open for year-round fishing, which removed its "30 day rule" which stated : "For the first 30 days of fishing season the speed limit is 5 mph around-the-clock". Long Lake is now open, year-round, to watercraft with a 45 mph speed limit in open basins EXCEPT at night and in the morning, when the speed limit is 5 mph. (The 5 mph limit applies after 8 p.m. or official sunset, whichever comes first, to 11 a.m.)
 After sunset, all crafts must use proper running lights.
 Crafts operating over 5 mph must be at least 200 feet off the shoreline. This must be observed because swimmers and nonmotorized craft tend to gather within the 200-foot safety zone. This rule also reduces the impact of wakes upon shore banks.
 Crafts operating over 5 mph, including personal watercraft or "jet skis," must also remain at least 100 feet away from all other craft and persons.
 All watercraft must travel in a counter-clockwise direction.
 Water skiing must be done in groups of at least three: a driver, an observer, and a skier. The observer is required to watch the skier at all times and to use a red or orange flag to signal when a skier is down in the water. All water skiers are required to wear an approved flotation device.
 Personal flotation devices must be on-board all watercraft, with one device required for each person and easily accessible. Children 12 years old and younger must wear a personal flotation device at all times if traveling on a vessel that is shorter than 19 feet.
 All personal watercraft (or "jet ski") operators must wear an approved flotation device.
 It is illegal to operate any craft while under the influence of drugs or alcohol.

Polar Bear Plunge
Each year on New Year's Day, Long Lake Park hosts the Polar Bear Plunge where hundreds ring in the new year by jumping into the lake.

References

Lakes of Washington (state)
Lakes of Thurston County, Washington
Tourist attractions in Thurston County, Washington